The Definition may refer to:
 The Definition (song), a 2008 song by Brandy
 The Definition (album), a 2011 album by Layzie Bone
 The DEFinition, a 2004 album by LL Cool J

See also
 The Definition Of..., a 2016 album by Fantasia
 Definition (disambiguation)